Ranérou Ferlo Department is one of the departments of Senegal, located in the Matam Region of the country. 

The only commune located within the department is the capital Ranérou. The rural districts (communautés rurales) comprise:
 Arrondissement de Vélingara:
 Lougré Thioly
 Oudalaye
 Vélingara

In the census of 2002, the population was 41,660. In 2005, it was estimated at 48,475.

Departments of Senegal
Matam Region